Dibromine monoxide is the chemical compound composed of bromine and oxygen with the formula Br2O. It is a dark brown solid which is stable below −40 °C and is used in bromination reactions. It is similar to dichlorine monoxide, the monoxide of its halogen neighbor one period higher on the periodic table. The molecule is bent, with C2v molecular symmetry. The Br−O bond length is 1.85 Å and the Br−O−Br bond angle is 112°, similar to dichlorine monoxide.

Reactions
Dibromine monoxide can be prepared by reacting bromine vapor or a solution of bromine in carbon tetrachloride with mercury(II) oxide at low temperatures:

2 Br2 + 2 HgO → HgBr2·HgO + Br2O

It can also be formed by thermal decomposition of bromine dioxide or by passing an electrical current through a 1:5 mixture of bromine and oxygen gases.

References

Bromine(I) compounds
Oxides
Nonmetal halides